Robert Priddy may refer to:

Robert L. Priddy, American co-founder of several airline companies
Bob Priddy, baseball player
Bob Priddy (basketball)